International Commercial Bank Tanzania Limited (ICBT), is a commercial bank in Tanzania, the second-largest economy in the East African Community. It is licensed by the Bank of Tanzania, the country's central bank and national banking regulator.

Overview
The bank is a member of the ICB Banking Group, a financial services conglomerate, headquartered in Schindellegi, Switzerland, with subsidiaries in Tanzania and Bangladesh.

In the past, ICB Banking Group owned banking subsidiaries in thirteen countries in Eastern Europe, Asia and Africa. The group has since divested from those countries, except for the two, mentioned in the previous paragraph.

As of December 2019, ICB Tanzania Limited owned total assets valued at TSh 79.546 billion (US$34.5 million), with shareholders equity of TSh 20.079 billion (US$8.7 million).

Ownership
ICB Tanzania Limited is majority owned by ICB Banking Group of Switzerland, and four non-Tanzanian minority shareholders. The table below illustrates the shareholding in the stock of International Commercial Bank Tanzania, as of November 2020.

Governance
The seven-person board of directors is chaired by Josephine Sevaretnam, a non-executive board member, who is also a minority shareholder. As of September 2020, Villy Vellayappan serves as the chief executive officer of the bank. He is assisted by nine other top managers in conducting the day-to-day business of the financial institution.

See also

References

External links
 Official Website
Website of Bank of Tanzania

Banks of Tanzania
Banks established in 1997
Companies of Tanzania
Economy of Dar es Salaam
1997 establishments in Tanzania